John June (fl. 1740–1770) was an English engraver, best known for his portraits and book illustrations.

Works

June worked regularly for the publisher Robert Sayer. He made engravings from his own drawings, as a general rule, though he did make plates after John Collett. Some of them, such as The Farm Yard and The Death of the Fox, were engraved in a bold style, and unusually large. His works include View of Cheapside on Lord Mayor's Day, November 1761.

Notes

Attribution

English engravers
18th-century English people
Place of birth missing
18th-century engravers